Anjan may refer to:

People 
 Anjan (given name), including a list of people with the name
 Atul Kumar Anjan, Indian politician
 Zahidur Rahman Anjan, Bangladeshi film director

Other uses 
 Anjan-class tugboat, Indian Navy service watercraft
 Anjan, a villiage in Gumla district, Jharkhand state, India

See also 
 Ajan (disambiguation)
 Anjar (disambiguation)
 Anjaan (disambiguation)